Crofoot is a surname. Notable people with the surname include:

Alan Crofoot (1929–1979), Canadian opera tenor and actor
Leonard Crofoot (born 1948), American actor, singer, dancer, writer and choreographer

Other uses
Crofoot may also refer to:
 The Crofoot, a Detroit entertainment complex